Penestola bufalis, the black penestola moth, is a moth in the family Crambidae. It was described by Achille Guenée in 1854. It is found in the US states of Texas and Florida, as well as on the Antilles (Cuba, Jamaica, Puerto Rico). It is an accidentally introduced species on the Galápagos Islands. The habitat consists of coastal mangrove swamps and shorelines.

The wingspan is about 20 mm. The forewings are dark brown to brownish gray with indistinct lines, as well as dense speckling. The hindwing have a similar color and lack prominent markings. Adults have been recorded on wing year round in Florida.

References

Moths described in 1854
Spilomelinae